These are the official results of men's shot put at the 1983 IAAF World Championships in Helsinki, Finland. There were a total number of 20 participating athletes, with the final held on 7 August 1983.

Medalists

Schedule
All times are Eastern European Summer Time (UTC+3)

Abbreviations
All results shown are in metres

Records

Final

Qualification
Held on Sunday 1983-08-07

See also
 1980 Men's Olympic Shot Put (Moscow)
 1983 Shot Put Year Ranking
 1984 Men's Olympic Shot Put (Los Angeles)
 1986 Men's European Championships Shot Put (Stuttgart)
 1988 Men's Olympic Shot Put (Seoul)

References
 Results
 IAAF results

s
Shot put at the World Athletics Championships